Rig Cheshmeh may refer to:
 Rig Cheshmeh, Aliabad, Golestan Province
 Rig Cheshmeh, Minudasht, Golestan Province
 Rig Cheshmeh-ye Pain, Golestan Province
 Rig Cheshmeh, Babol, Mazandaran Province
 Rig Cheshmeh, Sari, Mazandaran Province